The Descent of Anansi is a 1982 science fiction novel by American writers Steven Barnes and Larry Niven.

Plot summary
A space station manufactory attempts to become commercially independent from its government backers by exporting super-strong nanowire that can only be manufactured in free-fall.

Following an attempt to sabotage their first delivery and hijack the cargo, the intrepid crew realizes they can escape the hijackers. Their shuttle Anansi can become a modern-day version of its namesake, an African spider-god, by descending to Earth on a thread.

The physics of tidal forces are explained, and the possibilities of orbital tethers to accelerate payloads into higher orbits (or indeed de-orbit shuttles without retro-rockets) are woven into a hard science fiction thriller.

Reception
Dave Langford reviewed The Descent of Anansi for White Dwarf #54, and called it "Fast-moving, predictable, inoffensive."

Reviews
Review by Keith Soltys (1982) in Science Fiction & Fantasy Book Review, #10, December 1982
Review by Alan Fraser (1984) in Paperback Inferno, Volume 7, Number 6

References

External links
 Page at International Speculative Fiction Database

1982 American novels
1982 science fiction novels
Collaborative novels
Novels by Larry Niven